Baghlujeh Bayat (also Romanized as Bāghlūjeh Bayāt; also known as Bāghlūjeh, Bāghlūjeh-ye Mehtar, Bakildzhar, and Baqiljār) is a village in Zanjanrud-e Bala Rural District, in the Central District of Zanjan County, Zanjan Province, Iran. At the 2006 census, its population was 89, in 22 families.

References 

Populated places in Zanjan County